"Flower" is the debut solo single by Korean singer and Blackpink member Jisoo. It is scheduled to be released on March 31, 2023, by YG Entertainment as the lead single from her debut single album, Me.

Background and release
Following the release of bandmates Jennie's solo single "Solo" (2018), Rosé's solo single album R (2021), and Lisa's solo single album Lalisa (2021), attention turned towards Jisoo as the final member of Blackpink to debut as a soloist. On January 2, 2023, YG Entertainment confirmed that Jisoo was in the process of recording music for her single album and had completed filming the album's jacket photo shoots. On February 21, her label revealed that filming for her music video was underway in a top-secret location overseas, with the highest production budget they have ever invested into a Blackpink music video. On March 5, teasers were uploaded to Blackpink's social media accounts, confirming that her project would be released on March 31, 2023. On March 19, the album's lead single was confirmed to be "Flower" with a teaser poster including the title written in hangul in the shape of a flower.

Release history

References

2023 songs
2023 debut singles
Interscope Records singles
Jisoo songs
YG Entertainment singles